Sitanath Ghosh, is an Indian politician member of All India Trinamool Congress.  He is an MLA, elected from the  Jagatballavpur constituency in the 2021 West Bengal Legislative Assembly election. He joined AITC in 1998. From 1998 to 2009, he was a block vice president of Amta AC. From 2002 to 2005, he was district youth vice president. From 2008 to 2015, he was district general secretary. He contested his first election in 2013. He became Zila Parishad member in 2013 and again in 2018.

References 

Trinamool Congress politicians from West Bengal
Living people
People from Howrah district
West Bengal MLAs 2021–2026
Year of birth missing (living people)